Thai-Nichi Institute of Technology (TNI) is an industry-oriented private college located in Bangkok, Thailand. The college was established in 2006 by the Technology Promotion Association (Thailand-Japan). It was founded with the cooperation of Thai and Japanese organizations.

The main distinction of all of its curriculum is the inclusion of a half-year long internship in industry (cooperative program), especially in a Japanese company, and also mandatory Japanese and English language courses every semester.

The first enrollment in 2007 was approximately 300 students. In 2008, there were about 900 students. Many of the students received scholarships from Thai-Japanese organizations, Japanese companies and the Japan Chamber of Commerce (JCC).

Undergraduate courses
Faculty of Engineering
 Bachelor of Engineering
 Department of Automotive Engineering (AE)
 Department of Production Engineering (PE)
 Department of Computer Engineering (CE)
 Department of Industrial Engineering (IE)
 Department of Electrical Engineering (EE)
 Department of Digital Engineering (DGE) <International Programme>

Faculty of Information Technology
 Bachelor of Science
 Department of Information Technology (IT)
 Department of Multimedia Technology (MT)
 Department of Business Information System (BI)
 Department of Digital Technology in Mass Communication (DC)
 Department of Data Science and Analytics (DSA) <International Programme>

Faculty of Business Administration
 Bachelor of Business Administration
 Department of Business Japanese Administration (BJ)
 Department of International Business Management (IB)
 Department of Industrial Management (IM)
 Department of Accountancy (AC)
 Department of Japanese Human Resources (HR)
 Department of Creative Marketing (CM)
 Department of Logistics and Supply Chain Management (LM)

Graduate courses
 Master of Engineering (Engineering Technology) M.ET.
 Master of Science (Information Technology) M.IT.
 Master of Business Administration on Industrial Management
 Master of Business Administration on Strategic Planning and Management for Entrepreneur
 Master of Business Administration on Japanese Business Administration

Interchange 

Japan
Chiba Institute of Technology
Daido University
Institute of Technology
Kyushu University
Nagoya Institute of Technology
Osaka Institute of Technology
Shibaura Institute of Technology
Tokai University
Tokyo University of Agriculture and Technology
Tohoku University
Tohoku Institute of Technology
Toyoda Institute of Technology, etc.

See also
 Federation of Thai Industries (Thailand)
 Ministry of Economy, Trade and Industry (Japan)
 Ministry of Digital Economy and Society (Thailand)
 Egypt-Japan University of Science and Technology

References

External links 
 Thai-Nichi Institute of Technology Official website 
 Technology Promotion Association (Thailand-Japan) 

Universities and colleges in Bangkok
Educational institutions established in 2007
2007 establishments in Thailand
Institutes of higher education in Thailand
Japan–Thailand relations